HIT Entertainment Limited (commonly written as HiT) was a British-American entertainment company founded in 1982 as Henson International Television, the international distribution arm of The Jim Henson Company, by Jim Henson, Peter Orton, and Sophie Turner Laing. Orton alone took over the company in 1989 upon learning Henson's intent to sell the company to The Walt Disney Company. HIT owned and distributed children's television series such as Thomas & Friends, Fireman Sam, Bob the Builder, Pingu, Barney & Friends, and Angelina Ballerina.

HIT Entertainment was one of several partner companies, alongside NBCUniversal, PBS, and Sesame Workshop, that founded PBS Kids Sprout, with many of HIT's shows airing on the channel as a result at the time.

On 1 February 2012, HIT Entertainment was acquired by Mattel, as Mattel was initially only interested in the Thomas & Friends brand in its acquisition, according to Deadline Hollywood. Mattel absorbed the company on 31 March 2016 into its then newly created division, Mattel Creations.

History

1982–1990: Beginning and early years

Peter Orton had met Jim Henson when he was at the Children's Television Workshop handling distribution of Sesame Street. As a result, he became close friends with Henson and went to work with him in 1981. Together, they set up Henson International Television, which was the international distribution arm of Jim Henson Productions the following year, with Orton becoming the company's CEO.

Jim Henson Productions started negotiations with The Walt Disney Company regarding a possible purchase of the company in the late 1980s. Because of these negotiations, the company head, Orton and other employees at Henson International Television convinced Henson to allow them to spin off the distribution arm as an independent distribution company. Henson agreed, and Orton led a management buyout of the Henson International Television division from Henson in 1989, forming a new company named HIT Communications PLC.

1990–1999: Becoming independent 

HIT continued distributing programming by initially signing popular British series Postman Pat and the long-running Alvin and the Chipmunks series. The company then financed and distributed animated feature films based on The Wind in the Willows and Peter Rabbit books. Helping to fund the company was an investment by British satellite and cable television operator Flextech took a 23% share in HIT for about £600,000. The HIT Wildlife division was set up to produce nature and wildlife programming which provided the company with 35% of its revenue by the mid-1990s.

HIT also handled international distribution for Barney & Friends, produced by Allen, Texas-based Lyrick Studios. With the success of Barney, HIT began to develop its own programming. In 1996, HIT was listed on the AIM to raise funding; it used the funding to launch HIT Video that produced direct-to-video programming in the UK.

A new character came to the company's attention in 1996, when advertising executive and would-be cartoonist Keith Chapman pitched his idea to HIT Entertainment. Chapman's character was a little builder named Bob the Builder. While a number of other producers had turned down the idea, HIT recognized its potential and bought the rights to developing the Bob the Builder character into a television series.

With another offering in 1997, HIT increased its capitalization and move to the primary London Stock Exchange, whose funding HIT would use to develop some of its first original series, including Brambly Hedge, Percy the Park Keeper, and Kipper, which became its first hit on ITV.

In 1998, HIT formed its own animation production company, HOT Animation, and its Consumers Product Division. The BBC agreed to broadcast Bob the Builder. HIT signed a series of American broadcasting deals starting with Nickelodeon for Kipper and expanded to Starz/Encore for the Brambly Hedge and Percy the Park Keeper television series, HBO Family for the Anthony Ant cartoon series and Animal Planet for the Wylands Ocean World wildlife program. Kipper won the 1998 BAFTA Award for Best Children's Animation. At the end of the year, HIT offered another group of shares.

In 1999, HIT had 10 first-run television series in the United States and started an American subsidiary. In April, Bob the Builder successfully debuted on the BBC, and in July the company made another public offering of stock. An American deal for Bob the Builder was signed in December with Nickelodeon to start airing in January 2001. Mattel signed a five-year licensing agreement for the development of the Angelina Ballerina television series.

2000–2004: Bob the Builder to final independent years 
HIT, which had long been suggesting that it intended to expand its character stable through acquisitions, nearly found a partner in early 2000, when the company held talks with Britt Allcroft, the British company that held the licenses to such popular characters as Thomas the Tank Engine, Captain Pugwash, and Sooty. The two sides were unable to agree on a price, however, and the merger fell through. Bob the Builder continued its success with the number one record in December that year.

In December 2000, HIT's US division entered into a home video partnership with Lyrick Studios, home and owner of Barney & Friends, for distribution of Bob the Builder and Kipper releases. This early partnership was an early plan for that led to HIT purchasing Lyrick for $275 million, which would in turn give HIT a marketing and distribution network that it used to introduce its properties to U.S. audiences. Vice versa, the deal would help expand Barney's international presence, which was what Lyrick needed at the time. Chief Executive of HIT, Rob Lawes, was the driving force of the acquisition. The Lyrick acquisition encouraged HIT Entertainment to pursue new acquisitions.

In May 2001, the first Bob the Builder VHS volumes were released in the United States by HIT/Lyrick, while the company signed a deal with Sears to have Bob Shops in their retail stores. The Jim Henson Company's owner EM.TV was in financial trouble over its purchase of 50% share in Formula One racing rights, and HIT joined a number of companies willing to purchase TJHC. In October 2001, HIT's bid for Pingu BV was accepted.

In April 2002, HIT Entertainment sold their wildlife division to the newly formed Parthenon Entertainment, which was owned by the former managing director of HIT Wildlife, Carlos "Carl" Hall, with its 30 hours of programming in production and its 300-hour library was transferred in the management buyout agreement.

The board of Gullane Entertainment agreed that their company be purchased by HIT for £139million. The television shows owned by Gullane included Thomas & Friends, Magic Adventures of Mumfie, and Fireman Sam, which a stake of was purchased from S4C months before. On 22 August 2002, HIT Entertainment officially opened its Canadian office in Toronto, Ontario.

In March 2003, CCI Entertainment re-acquired its stake from HIT which was part of the purchase of Gullane and its library rights in Canada. HIT's next television series Rubbadubbers aired in September that year. CCI would in a decade's time be acquired and folded into 9 Story Media Group.

On 1 April 2004, HIT and The Jim Henson Company agreed to a five-year global distribution and production deal which included distribution of 440 hours of TJHC's remaining library, including Fraggle Rock, Emmet Otter's Jug-Band Christmas, The Hoobs, and Jim Henson's Mother Goose Stories. In addition, the agreement also included the production of new properties, including Frances, in which both companies co-produced. Both companies co-owned the copyright to the series. While firing its chief executive Rob Lawes in October 2004, the company announced its launching of a 24-hour preschool channel known as PBS Kids Sprout with PBS, Comcast, and Sesame Workshop.

2005–2011: Apax Partners ownership
On 22 March 2005, Apax Partners purchased HIT for £489.4 million, taking it private, with former BBC director general Greg Dyke becoming chairman. On 26 August 2005, HIT announced an agreement with NBCUniversal, PBS, and Sesame Workshop to launch the world's first 24-hour preschool television channel entitled PBS Kids Sprout, with HIT supplying programming for the channel as a result at the time.

In 2006, HIT closed its DVD sales and distribution arm in the U.S. and contracted with 20th Century Fox Home Entertainment for DVD distribution. Soon, the distribution deal ended and was transferred to Lionsgate Home Entertainment who distributed HIT's videos from May 2008 to 2014. HIT continued to sell and distribute its own DVD output in the UK.

In September 2007, the company and Chellomedia formed a joint venture to run the JimJam children's channel. HIT Entertainment opened its own toy company: the HIT Toy Company.

In 2008, HIT hired former Nickelodeon executive, Jeffrey D. Dunn, as chief executive and moved DVD distribution from 20th Century Fox to Lionsgate Home Entertainment. Dunn drove the company to create new characters, including Mike the Knight, and to revitalize existing brands. In February, HIT sold the Guinness World Records brand, acquired through HIT's acquisition of Gullane Entertainment, to Ripley Entertainment. They also sold the rights to the Sooty characters and properties to his current presenter, Richard Cadell. HIT had put the rights to Sooty up for sale in October 2007.

In March 2009, HIT Entertainment started its HIT Movies division in Los Angeles, California, with Julia Pistor as division head, to create films based on the company's franchises. The division's first planned film adaptation was a live-action Thomas & Friends film, scheduled for late 2010.

In early 2010, HIT licensed Thomas & Friends to Mattel for toys. By August, the company withdrew from the JimJam joint venture, but agreed to continue providing programming for the channel until the absorption into Mattel.

In April 2011, Apax put HIT up for sale, with the option to sell the company in two parts: Thomas & Friends franchise and the other HIT characters with its PBS Kids Sprout stake, with either parts or separately. Several bidders came forward, including The Walt Disney Company, Viacom, Mattel, Hasbro, Classic Media, Chorion, and Saban Brands. By April 2011, Fireman Sam was a Top 10 UK best-selling character toy according to NPD Group. Their next programme Mike the Knight, a co-production between Nelvana aired on Treehouse TV and CBeebies later in the year.

Mattel subsidiary

Apax Partners agreed to sell HIT Entertainment to Mattel on 24 October 2011 for $680 million excluding its share of the PBS Kids Sprout television channel. The sale/merger was completed on 1 February 2012, and HIT Entertainment became a wholly owned subsidiary of Mattel, which was managed under its Fisher-Price unit. Due to the success of the Thomas & Friends brand, which accounted for 80% of HIT's revenues, there was talks of Mattel only wanting to purchase that franchise rather than the entire HIT library. Mattel had already worked alongside HIT Entertainment and handled marketing for Thomas & Friends toys. On 3 July 2012, it was reported that Mattel considered selling and sought a buyer for Barney and Angelina Ballerina, but they eventually kept them.

HIT announced a DVD distribution deal with Universal Pictures Home Entertainment on 2 May 2014. in which Universal began distributing their catalogue for Blu-ray and DVD electronic sell-through and VOD platforms in the United States and Canada. In early summer 2015, the Edaville amusement park opened a licensed Thomas Land theme area based on Thomas & Friends. On 6 October 2015, HIT Entertainment announced a long-term partnership with 9 Story Media Group to relaunch Barney & Friends and Angelina Ballerina.

On 31 March 2016, HIT was absorbed into a newly created division called Mattel Creations.

References

External links
Official website (archived)
The UK Government's Companies House page

 
American companies established in 1982
American companies disestablished in 2016
British companies established in 1982
British companies disestablished in 2016
Mass media companies established in 1982
Mass media companies disestablished in 2016
2005 mergers and acquisitions
2012 mergers and acquisitions
Television production companies of the United Kingdom
Television production companies of the United States
Mattel subsidiaries
Companies formerly listed on the London Stock Exchange
Former The Jim Henson Company subsidiaries
Entertainment companies of the United Kingdom
Mass media companies based in New York City
Companies based in Los Angeles